Song Kyung-Taek (Hangul: 송경택, Hanja: 宋炅澤, born July 10, 1983) is a South Korean short track speed skater. He won four gold medals at the World Championships but has not participated in any Olympics yet.

Song currently belongs to the Goyang City Hall short track speed skating team along with 2009 World Champion Lee Ho-Suk.

External links
 Song Kyung-Taek's profile, from http://www.sportresult.com; retrieved 2010-03-12.

1983 births
Living people
South Korean male short track speed skaters
Asian Games medalists in short track speed skating
Asian Games gold medalists for South Korea
Asian Games silver medalists for South Korea
Short track speed skaters at the 2007 Asian Winter Games
Medalists at the 2007 Asian Winter Games
World Short Track Speed Skating Championships medalists
Universiade gold medalists for South Korea
Universiade medalists in short track speed skating
Medalists at the 2003 Winter Universiade
21st-century South Korean people